On March 21–22, 1932, a deadly tornado outbreak struck the Midwestern and Southern United States. At least 38 tornadoes—including 27 killers and several long-lived tornado families—struck the Deep South, killing more than 330 people and injuring 2,141. Tornadoes affected areas from Mississippi north to Illinois and east to South Carolina, but Alabama was hardest hit, with 268 fatalities; the outbreak is considered to be the deadliest ever in that U.S. state, and among the worst ever in the United States, trailing only the Tri-State tornado outbreak in 1925, with 747 fatalities, and the Tupelo–Gainesville outbreak in 1936, with 454 fatalities. The 1932 outbreak is believed to have produced 10 violent tornadoes, eight of which occurred in Alabama alone.

Background and impact
At 7 a.m. Conditions in Alabama and Mississippi were mostly cloudy with early thunderstorm activity, yet temperatures were already in the low 70s and upper 60s °F in Mississippi and western Tennessee. By afternoon, temperatures rose to the middle to upper 70s °F across most of the area. As a cold front approached Alabama, forecasters predicted afternoon thunderstorms and an end to the warm temperatures but did not anticipate the magnitude of the severe weather that later hit most of the state from north of Montgomery to the Tennessee and Georgia borders.

As the outbreak progressed, eight other F4 tornadoes struck Alabama, Tennessee, and Georgia. In Alabama, within four hours of the first F4 tornado, 18 people were killed near the Cullman area in Cullman County; 14 in the Columbiana area in Shelby County; 41 in Coosa and Talladega counties near Sylacauga; and 38 people in other small communities in Northeastern Alabama, mostly in Jackson County. One of the tornadoes followed the deadly Jemison event by one hour and passed just  to the southeast, killing 31 people in and around the Clanton area in Chilton County.

Outside Alabama, six people were killed near Pulaski, Tennessee, in Giles County. 13 people in the state died from this and six other strong tornadoes. In Georgia and Tennessee, a large tornado near the state line left a mile-wide damage path, and killed 15 people from Beaverdale, Georgia, to Conasauga, Tennessee. Two other tornadoes in Georgia killed a combined 16 people and were on the ground almost simultaneously. On March 22, tornadoes continued after midnight CST (06:00 UTC) as four more strong tornadoes struck Georgia and South Carolina until 2:00 a.m. CST (08:00 UTC). One of them passed near the University of Georgia in Athens and killed 12 people.

Confirmed tornadoes

March 21 event

March 22 event

Aftermath and recovery
The outbreak was the most damaging on record in the Southeastern United States since February 19–20, 1884. At least 25 cities and communities in Alabama reported one fatality or more during the day, including Demopolis, Union Grove, Linden, Plantersville, Sycamore, Northport, Huntsville, Marion, Stanton, Scottsboro, Paint Rock, Columbiana, Faunsdale, Bethel Church, Jemison, Falkville, Sylacauga, Bridgeport, Lineville, Gantts Quarry, Cullman, and Corinth. 11 counties were particularly hard hit, with 7,000 homes and businesses destroyed statewide. Seven tornadoes each caused at least 100 injuries in Alabama and Tennessee, with a total of 1,750 injuries in Alabama alone. In all, the 38 recorded tornadoes caused at least $4.34 million (1932 USD) in damages for the entire outbreak.

Oddities/records
The March 21 outbreak is also nicknamed a Super Outbreak by the National Weather Service office in Birmingham, the only other episodes thusly designated being those of April 3, 1974, and April 27, 2011. While Alabama was the hardest-hit state with 86 fatalities, 75 of which were tornado-related, during the 1974 event, there were nearly three times as many fatalities in the state on March 21, 1932. Also, many tornadoes in rural areas this day likely caused more injuries and probably higher fatalities than reported, as newspapers paid little attention to the deaths of Black sharecroppers, whose families and identities were often unknown. Such a racial aspect was common during natural disasters in the South before desegregation in the late 20th century. The 1932 outbreak was also known for its violence: it set a 24-hour record for violent touchdowns in a single state until the 1974 Super Outbreak produced 11 F4 or F5 tornadoes in Kentucky.

Just six days later, on March 27, several other tornadoes struck Alabama again, with an F3 tornado traveling , passing south of Jemison, and killing five people near Thorsby and Collins Chapel. Sightseers who visited the area to view damage from March 21 were forced to take shelter as the funnel cloud neared. This tornado was photographed and incorrectly labeled as the F4 tornado that hit the area, also near Jemison in Shelby County, on March 21.

See also
Tornado outbreak of March 21–22, 1952 – Produced 11 violent tornadoes exactly 20 years later
List of North American tornadoes and tornado outbreaks

Notes

References

Sources

F4 tornadoes by date
Tornadoes of 1932
Tornadoes in Alabama
Tornadoes in Tennessee
Tornadoes in Georgia (U.S. state)
Tornado outbreaks
Deep South tornado outbreak